Martin Detelinov Petkov (born 15 August 2002) is a Bulgarian footballer who plays as a forward for Septemvri Sofia.

Career
Petkov made his competitive debut at the age of 16 years and 8 months, in a 0–2 home league loss against Ludogorets on 14 April 2019, coming on as a substitute for Stanislav Ivanov. On 25 September 2019, he scored his first brace for the club in the 5–1 away win against Spartak Varna in the first round of the Bulgarian Cup. After joining Ukrainian club Chornomorets Odesa in January 2022, in February 2022 he cancelled his contract with the club and signed a deal with Slavia Sofia.

Career statistics

Club

References

External links
 
 Profile at LevskiSofia.info
 Profile at Levski Academy

Living people
2002 births
Bulgarian footballers
Bulgaria youth international footballers
PFC Levski Sofia players
FC Chornomorets Odesa players
PFC Slavia Sofia players
FC Septemvri Sofia players
First Professional Football League (Bulgaria) players
Association football forwards
Bulgaria under-21 international footballers
Bulgarian expatriate footballers
Expatriate footballers in Ukraine
Bulgarian expatriate sportspeople in Ukraine